A surface, as the term is most generally used, is the outermost or uppermost layer of a physical object or space.

Surface or surfaces may also refer to:

Mathematics
Surface (mathematics), a generalization of a plane which needs not be flat
Surface (differential geometry), a differentiable two-dimensional manifold
Surface (topology), a two-dimensional manifold
Algebraic surface, an algebraic variety of dimension two
Coordinate surfaces
Fractal surface, generated using a stochastic algorithm
Polyhedral surface
Surface area
Surface integral

Arts and entertainment
Surface (band), an American R&B and pop trio
Surface (Surface album), 1986
Surfaces (band), American musical duo
Surface (Circle album), 1998
"Surface" (Aero Chord song), 2014
Surface (2005 TV series), an American science fiction show, 2005–2006
Surface (2022 TV series), an American psychological thriller miniseries that began streaming in 2022
The Surface, an American film, 2014
"Surface", a song by Your Memorial from the 2010 album Atonement

Physical sciences
Surface finishing, a range of industrial processes that alter the surface of a manufactured item to achieve a certain property
Surface science, the study of physical and chemical phenomena that occur at the interface of two phases
Surface wave, a mechanical wave, in physics
Interface (matter), common boundary among two different phases of matter
Planetary surface
Surface of the Earth
Sea surface

Transportation
 Surface mail, transportation of mail that travel on land and sea but not air
 Surface transport, transportation of goods and people on land and sea

People
Harvey A. Surface (1867–1941), American zoologist and Pennsylvania legislator
Mary Hall Surface (born 1958), American playwright and theater director

Technology
Microsoft Surface, the brand for a line of computers and related accessories by Microsoft
Microsoft PixelSense (formerly known as Surface), a commercial computing platform
Computer representation of surfaces, a way of representing objects, in technical applications of 3D computer graphics
Deep structure and surface structure, concepts in Chomskyan linguistics

Publications
Surface (magazine), an American architecture magazine since 1993
Surfaces (Université de Montréal journal), published from 1991 to 1999
Surfaces (MDPI journal), published from 2018 onwards
Surface Science (journal)

See also
Surfacing (disambiguation)